William of Falgar (died 1297 or 1298) was a Franciscan theologian from south-west France, a follower of Bonaventure.

He entered the Franciscan Order at Toulouse. He became bishop of Viviers in 1296.

Notes

External links
 Franaut page

List of works (at Guillelmus de Falgario)

1290s deaths
13th-century French Catholic theologians
French Franciscans
Scholastic philosophers
Bishops of Viviers
Year of birth unknown